Eluned Morgan may refer to:

Eluned Morgan (author) (1870–1938), Welsh writer
Eluned Morgan, Baroness Morgan of Ely (born 1967), Welsh politician